Alitalia CityLiner operates flights to the following destinations as part of the network of parent Alitalia.

References

Lists of airline destinations
Alitalia